Arcadia is a town in, and the parish seat of, Bienville Parish in northern Louisiana, United States. The population was 2,919 at the 2010 census. Arcadia has the highest elevation of any incorporated municipality in Louisiana. Arcadia's name commemorates the Ancient Greek region of Arcadia.

History
In 1934, bank robbers Bonnie and Clyde were killed near Arcadia in a shootout. Their bodies were brought for embalming to a furniture store in Arcadia which also served as a funeral parlor. Enormous crowds of onlookers descended upon the city when news of the pair's deaths there became public.

Arcadia has been a center of the poultry industry, with up to 300 independent growers for years supplying the local feed mill operated by poultry company Pilgrim's Pride. In 2009 the company, facing bankruptcy, announced that it would close most of its Louisiana operations, including plants in Arcadia, Athens, Choudrant, and Farmerville; these operations were estimated to have provided a combined 1,300 jobs. Several weeks later, Pilgrim's Pride accepted an $80 million offer from Foster Farms of California to purchase their operations and keep the plants running. Foster Farms put up $40 million of the purchase price, with the other $40 million covered by the State of Louisiana.

Geography

Demographics

At the census of 2000, there were 3,041 people, 1,071 households, and 737 families residing in the town. At the 2019 American Community Survey, Arcadia had a population of 2,774 people and 1,469 housing units. As of the 2020 United States census, there were 2,746 people, 1,127 households, and 620 families residing in the town.

In 2019, the racial makeup of Arcadia was 73.2% Black or African American, 22% non-Hispanic white, 4.1% some other race, and 0.7% two or more races. Previously, the racial makeup of the town was 37.98% White, 60.57% African American, 0.26% Native American, 0.10% Asian, 0.26% from other races, and 0.82% from two or more races. Hispanics or Latinos of any race were 1.61% of the population.

In 2000, there were 1,071 households, out of which 31.7% had children under the age of 18 living with them, 37.0% were married couples living together, 27.9% had a female householder with no husband present, and 31.1% were non-families. 28.5% of all households were made up of individuals, and 12.7% had someone living alone who was 65 years of age or older. The average household size was 2.57 and the average family size was 3.16. In the town of Arcadia, the population was spread out, with 27.1% under the age of 18, 9.2% from 18 to 24, 24.4% from 25 to 44, 18.7% from 45 to 64, and 20.6% who were 65 years of age or older. The median age was 37 years. For every 100 females, there were 81.1 males. For every 100 females age 18 and over, there were 73.3 males.

The median income for a household in the town was $21,661, and the median income for a family was $26,250. Males had a median income of $25,885 versus $17,279 for females. The per capita income for the town was $10,962. About 27.1% of families and 31.4% of the population were below the poverty line, including 42.7% of those under age 18 and 20.6% of those age 65 or over. At the 2019 census estimates, the median household income increased to $23,494. About 41.9% of the population lived at or below the poverty line, and 17.5% of Arcadians held a bachelor's degree or higher.

Religion
Among the numerous churches in downtown Arcadia are First United Methodist Church and the First Baptist Church, both in large sanctuaries. The Louisiana Baptist Convention was founded in 1848 in nearby Mount Lebanon.

Government
The Bienville Parish Courthouse was formerly located in a residential section of Arcadia but moved in 2013 to a newly constructed building off Interstate 20.

Media

The weekly newspaper, The Bienville Democrat, is printed on Wednesdays in Natchitoches, and then distributed across Bienville Parish. The current editor is Priscilla Smith. 

A former Bienville Democrat editor, Wayne E. Dring (1940–2017), managed the newspaper for fifteen years, in which capacity he attended nearly all public events in Bienville Parish.

Education
Arcadia is a part of the Bienville Parish School Board. Arcadia's two public schools are located in the Arcadia School Complex, which encompasses both Arcadia High School and Crawford Elementary

Transportation
The Arcadia-Bienville Parish Airport is located two nautical miles (2.3 mi, 3.7 km) southwest of Arcadia's central business district.

Notable people
 Rodney Cook, organizer of Possums Unlimited (“or PU for short” ) and its annual Possum Festival which provided over $100,000 in its 10 year run to charities including St. Jude Children's Research Hospital
 Marcus Fizer, professional basketball player, former collegiate All-American at Iowa State University (1999–2000) and McDonald's All-American from Arcadia High School (1996–1997)
 Patrick O. Jefferson, African-American member of the Louisiana House of Representatives for District 11 since 2012; lawyer in Arcadia
 Dub Jones, retired Pro Bowler born in 1924
 Henderson Jordan (1896–1958), Bienville Parish sheriff who participated in the ambush of Bonnie and Clyde
 C. L. McCrary (1905–1989), Arcadia businessman and state representative from Bienville Parish from 1960 to 1964 
 Philip H. Mecom (1889–1969), United States Attorney for the Western District of Louisiana
 Danny Roy Moore (1925–c. 2020), State senator from Bienville and Claiborne parishes
 Prentiss Oakley (1905–1957), Jordan's successor as sheriff; also part of the posse that brought down Bonnie and Clyde
 Pol Perritt, MLB player, pitched for New York Giants in 1917 World Series
 Bettye Swann, soul singer best known for the 1967 hit "Make Me Yours"
 Lorris M. Wimberly, former four-time Speaker of the Louisiana House of Representatives, farmer and insurance agent
 Rush Wimberly, lawyer in Arcadia and Shreveport, member of both houses of the Louisiana legislature from 1900 to 1912; former Bienville Parish attorney and school superintendent

References

External links

Town of Arcadia official website

Towns in Bienville Parish, Louisiana
Towns in Louisiana
Populated places in Ark-La-Tex
Parish seats in Louisiana
1855 establishments in Louisiana
County seats in the Ark-La-Tex